Xiong'erzhai Township is a township located at northern Pinggu District, Beijing, China. It is at the foothill of the Yan Mountain Range. The township borders Zhenluoying Town to the north, Huangsongyu Township and Nandulehe Town to the east, Shandongzhuang and Wangxinzhuang  Towns to the south, and Dahuashan Town to the west. Its population was 2,859 as of 2020. 

Xiong'erzhai was said to be first established by the Yellow Emperor during his war with Chiyou, and the region was named in honor of his clan, Youxiong.

History

Administrative divisions 
As of the year 2021, Xiong'erzhai Township was composed of 8 villages, all of which are shown in the following list:

See also 

 List of township-level divisions of Beijing

References 

Pinggu District
Township-level divisions of Beijing